Gabriel Abaroa Jr. is the president emeritus of the Latin Recording Academy (LARAS), which presents the Latin Grammy Awards. He served as its CEO from 2003 to August 2021. LARAS was established in 1997 and the first Latin Grammy Awards took place in 2000.

Career
Before joining the Latin Recording Academy, Abaroa had served as CEO of Wireless Latin Entertainment and IFPI Latin America. Prior to becoming President of the Academy he served as Vice-Chairman of the Latin Recording Academy's board of trustees. In March 2003 he became President of the Latin Recording Academy. In August 2010, Abaroa was promoted to President/CEO of the Academy. Abaroa is also a member of the National Council of La Raza and is a trustee of the Miami Symphony Orchestra. He also serves as a member of Enlace México. Abaroa was listed as one of Billboard's Latin Power Players in 2016. He was succeeded by Manuel Abud.

See also
Latin Academy of Recording Arts & Sciences
Latin Grammy Awards

References

 

Latin Grammy Awards
Presidents of the Latin Recording Academy
Living people
Year of birth missing (living people)